Luiz Flávio Silverio Silva (born 15 June 2000), known as Flávio, is a Brazilian footballer who plays as a midfielder for Mirassol Futebol Clube

Club career
Flávio was born in Salinas, Minas Gerais, and joined América Mineiro's youth setup in 2017. He made his first team debut on 25 August 2019; after coming on as a second-half substitute for Geovane, he scored a last-minute winner in a 3–2 Série B win over Guarani.

On 20 May 2021, Flávio moved to Cruzeiro on loan until the end of the year.

Personal life
Flávio's twin brother Luiz Felipe is also a footballer and a midfielder. He finished his formation with Bahia.

Career statistics

References

External links
 

2000 births
Living people
Sportspeople from Minas Gerais
Brazilian footballers
Association football midfielders
Campeonato Brasileiro Série B players
América Futebol Clube (MG) players
Cruzeiro Esporte Clube players